Acacia sublanata is a shrub of the genus Acacia and the subgenus Plurinerves that is endemic to an area of northern Australia.

Description
Like most species of Acacia it has phyllodes rather than true leaves.

Taxonomy
The species was first formally described by the botanist George Bentham in 1837 as part of the work Leguminosae. Enumeratio plantarum quas in Novae Hollandiae ora austro-occidentali ad fluvium Cygnorum et in Sinu Regis Georgii collegit Carolus liber baro de Hügel. It was reclassified by Leslie Pedley  in 1987 as Racosperma sublanatum then transferred back to genus Acacia in 2001.

Distribution
It is native to an area in the top end of the Northern Territory from around the upper South Alligator River and East Alligator Rivers in the west across to the Groote Eylandt and the Gove Peninsula in the east and is often a part of woodland communities growing in areas of sandstone.

See also
List of Acacia species

References

sublanata
Plants described in 1837
Taxa named by George Bentham
Flora of the Northern Territory